Hasanabad (also Romanized as Ḩasanābād; also known as Ḩasanābād-e Leylān) is a village in Leylan-e Jonubi Rural District, Leylan District, Malekan County, East Azerbaijan Province, Iran. At the 2006 census, its population was 974, in 239 families.

References 

Populated places in Malekan County